Bye Bye Bangkok is a 2011 Bengali comedy drama film, directed by Aniket Chattopadhyay. It featured Swastika Mukherjee, Rajesh Sharma, Silajit Majumder, Rudranil Ghosh, Kharaj Mukherjee, Anjana Basu, Locket Chatterjee, Sonali Chowdhury, Kanchan Mullick, Kanchana Maitra, Neel Mukherjee, Rajatava Dutta, Biswajit Chakraborty, Sudipa Basu and others.

The film was shot in Bangkok and Kolkata.

Plot
Avijit Banerjee runs his own software company. His secretary who is completely absent minded and has got a terrible memory always goes with him wherever he goes. His wife Anwesha and her driver plan to go abroad thanks to Anwesha.Anirban, an ad filmmaker dreams of becoming a filmmaker. Aparajita, his wife who is a professor of philosophy doesn't like his lifestyle. Milon deals in real estate and his wife Pritha who runs a non-governmental organization always dreams of getting awards without doing anything. Priyatosh is a salesman of biscuits and his wife Nandita models for ad films. Most of them are going with each other's husband/wife without any of them knowing each other and somehow they all land up in Bangkok and even stay in the same hotel. A series of hilarious events occur and one particular event brings all of them together. They all blame Sadhu Charan as the main reason behind all this and they leave him and Avijit's secretary in Bangkok and go back.

Cast
 Neel Mukherjee as Avijit Banerjee
 Silajit Majumder as Anirban Bose
 Rudranil Ghosh as Sadhucharan Das
 Kharaj Mukherjee as Milan Sadhukhan
 Swastika Mukherjee as Tanima
 Locket Chatterjee as Anwesha Banerjee
 Anjana Basu as Aparajita Bose
 Kanchan Mallick as Priyotosh Bagchi
 Rajesh Sharma as Hotel Receptionist
 Sonali Chowdhury as Pritha Sadhukhan
 Kanchana Moitra as Nandita Bagchi
 Rajatava Dutta as Rajatava Dutta (special appearance)
 Arindol Bagchi as Boss of Biscuit Company
 Sudipa Basu
 Biswajit Chakraborty as Head of Travel Agency

References

2011 films
Bengali-language Indian films
2010s Bengali-language films
Films directed by Aniket Chattopadhyay
Films shot in Bangkok
Films shot in Kolkata

External links